Mohammed Samir Gaber (born 2 March 1996) known professionally as HGM Moe Ji One (/Moe ji wʌn/) is an actor, voice actor, musician, entrepreneur, photographer and designer from Sudan. He is an actor in the Arabic Netflix show Takki.

Early life and family 
Mohammed was born to Samir Jumma, his father, and Eman, his mother, on March the 2nd 1996 in Khartoum. He was born into a Muslim family and follows the Islamic religion. He moved from Sudan to Saudi Arabia when he was just a year old. Samir Gaber is the eldest of his three siblings.

Career 
Gaber has worked as a voice actor in many different TV shows and movies, where he has voiced different characters.

Voice Acting 
He is also known as HGM Moe Ji One and he has worked in 60 movies and TV series. Some of his work include:
 Takki (2012–2022)
Takki is a Saudi Arabian web series about a young aspiring filmmaker and his group of friends who struggle with family expectations, gender roles, rivalry and romance. He voiced the role of Moe in this web series and debuted in the 3rd season of the show.

 Fi Al La La Land (2017)

Fi Al La La Land is a TV series about a group of people who become stranded on an inhabited island after a forced plane landing, and struggle to survive. Samir Gaber voiced the role of Lamona in this series.

 Masameer County (2021)

Masameer County is an animated series about life in a changing Saudi Arabia that incorporates stories about a long-standing tribal feud, media war, and a health craze gone too far. Samir Gaber voiced the role of Shamsh in the English version of this series.

 Rashash (2021)

Rashash is a thriller TV miniseries set in the 1980s in Saudi Arabia, which follows the fall of a notorious criminal and the police's endeavors to take him down. Samir Gaber voiced the role of a police officer in the series who is working to take down the criminal.

 Suits The Arabic Remake (2022)

Suits The Arabic Remake is a TV series about a pair of lawyers who work together to solve thorny cases. Samir Gaber voiced the hotel manager in various episodes of this show.

 Rise Oof The Witches (2023)

It is a story about growing up in a magical, male-dominated culture where women are not allowed to use magic in any way. Witches learn their craft in secret and form their own groups in order to achieve power and protect themselves.

Photography & Designing 
As a designer, Gaber has designed and filmed a lot of advertisements for Pepsi, Almarai, and some local companies like DEEM Perfume and &Secret in the Middle East and made a name for himself in this field as well.

NFT & Digital Art 
Gaber has been selling his work in the form of NFTs since 2020. His famous Purple Angel have been auctioned off on several platforms, including Nifty Gateway and OpenSea. His distinctive, one-of-a-kind (1/1) purple angel is on display in Riyadh's Al Faisal Arabic & Islamic Arts Museum.

Music 
Gaber as a musician made it to several streaming platforms and got verified via his music.

Mohammed S Gaber's first album was released in early 2014 and was featured in Ghazali with Saad Lamjarred. The album was featured on MBC FM radio. Songs that are released by HGM Moe Ji One:

Filmography

Films 
This is a schedule of all the films that HGM Moe Ji One has voice acted in.

Television series

References

External links 
 
 
 Mohammed S Gaber Interview in Audible 
 Samir Jumaa's Interview in Blue Nile Channel
 Jumaa In a Sudanese Newspapers

1996 births
Voice actors
Sudanese musicians
Sudanese actors
Businesspeople
Living people